Michael Dennis Groff (born November 16, 1961 in Van Nuys, California) is a former race car driver who competed in CART and the IRL IndyCar Series and was the 1989 Indy Lights champion. His younger brother Robbie was also a CART and IRL driver from 1994 to 1998.

Racing career

Formula Super Vee and Indy Lights
Groff made his professional debut in 1984 competing in the Valvoline/Robert Bosche Formula Super Vee series. He finished third in the series in 1985 and second in 1986. In 1986 he also made his American Racing Series debut (later renamed Indy Lights). Driving for a family team, he captured wins at the Milwaukee Mile and Road America and finished third in points. In 1987 he won at Nazareth Speedway and finished fifth in points. In 1988 he only competed in three Indy Lights races for three different teams, but finished second at Nazareth. In 1989 he competed full-time for Leading Edge Racing and captured four wins on his way to the championship.

CART Champ Car
Groff attempted to make his CART Champ Car debut in the 1990 Indianapolis 500 for Euromotorsport but failed to qualify. He made his debut three weeks later at the Detroit Grand Prix with the same team and completed the season with them. In 12 starts he had a best finish of seventh at Nazareth and finished 17th in points.

In 1991 Groff initially returned to Euromotorsport but switched to A. J. Foyt Enterprises for the final five races of the season. his best finish was eighth (three times) and he finished 16th in points. He also competed in his first Indianapolis 500.

Groff entered 1992 without a full-time ride. He qualified a second car for Walker Racing in the 1992 Indianapolis 500 but when regular driver Scott Goodyear failed to qualify, he replaced Groff. Groff made six starts that season for Euromotorsport (2 races), Walker (1 race), and Foyt (3 races) and finished 23rd in points.

In 1993 Groff joined Rahal-Hogan Racing for a limited race schedule. Groff made six starts in 1993 for Rahal-Hogan with a best finish of ninth at Portland International Raceway. He finished 23rd in points.

1994 saw Groff return to Rahal-Hogan full-time. The team had since abandoned their bespoke chassis but were the first team to experiment with Honda's new CART engine package. The team struggled with the package throughout the season and had to purchase Ilmor-powered cars from Team Penske to make the 1994 Indianapolis 500. Despite a full-season with a well-funded team, Groff only finished 20th in points. Rahal managed a slightly more respectable tenth.

In 1995 Groff's only on-track activity was practice laps for the 1995 Indianapolis 500 with Chip Ganassi Racing, but he did not make an attempt to qualify.

IRL IndyCar
In 1996 Groff joined the new IRL IndyCar Series with Foyt Enterprises. Groff finished sixth in the series' first race and third at the second race at Phoenix International Raceway. He then was hired by Walker to race in the CART race at Nazareth where he finished 14th and qualified 11th for the 1996 Indy 500 but was sidelined by a fire after 122 laps, also driving for Walker (which was one of the few teams to participate in both CART and the IRL in 1996). Groff finished sixth in the 1996 IRL championship.

For the 1996-1997 Indy Racing League season Groff joined Byrd/Cunningham and captured 3 straight top-five finishes to start the season including a third at the Las Vegas Motor Speedway and a second at Walt Disney World Speedway (the first with the series new naturally aspirated cars). He finished 12th in the 1997 Indianapolis 500 and finished fourteenth in the championship. Groff returned to Byrd-Cunningham Racing in 1998. After finishes of 7th, 15th, and 15th to start the season, he was replaced at the Texas Motor Speedway race by John Paul Jr. He was out of a ride for the rest of the season.

Groff attempted to qualify for the 1999 Indianapolis 500 for Team Xtreme Racing but failed to make the field. It would be his last IndyCar appearance.

Racing record

American open–wheel racing results
(key)

Indy Lights

CART

Indy Racing League

Indianapolis 500

External links
Driver Database Profile

1961 births
American racing drivers
Champ Car drivers
Indianapolis 500 drivers
Indy Lights champions
Indy Lights drivers
SCCA Formula Super Vee drivers
IndyCar Series drivers
Sportspeople from Los Angeles County, California
People from Van Nuys, Los Angeles
Racing drivers from Los Angeles
Racing drivers from California
Living people
Walker Racing drivers
EuroInternational drivers
A. J. Foyt Enterprises drivers
Chip Ganassi Racing drivers
Rahal Letterman Lanigan Racing drivers